The Yichang Yangtze River Railway Bridge is an arch bridge in Yichang, Chongqing, China. The bridge was completed in 2008 and carries the Yichang−Wanzhou Railway across the Yangtze River. The bridge has two main spans of  each.

See also
 Yangtze River bridges and tunnels

References

Bridges in Hubei
Bridges completed in 2008
Bridges over the Yangtze River
Railway bridges in China